Nicola Beer (born 23 January 1970) is a German lawyer and politician of the Free Democratic Party (FDP) who has been serving as a Member of the European Parliament since 2019, and as one of its Vice-Presidents.

Early life and career
Beer finished highschool with a bilingual degree in German and French in 1989. She went on to study law at the University of Frankfurt from 1991 until 1997.

Political career

Career in state politics
Beer became member of the FDP in 1991. She was first elected as member of the Landtag of Hesse in the 1999 state elections. Between 2008 and 2009, she served as deputy chairperson of the FDP parliamentary group, under the leadership of chairman Jörg-Uwe Hahn.

In the cabinets of minister-presidents Roland Koch and Volker Bouffier, Beer served as State Secretary for European Affairs at the Hessian State Ministry of Justice between 2009 and 2012. In this capacity, she represented Hesse on the European Committee of the Regions. Between 2012 and 2014 she was State Minister of Education and Cultural Affairs in Hesse.

Career in national politics
Beer was a FDP delegate to the Federal Convention for the purpose of electing the President of Germany in 2004, 2009, 2010, 2012 and 2017.

In late 2013, incoming FDP chairman Christian Lindner nominated Beer for the office of Secretary General; on 7 December 2013 she got elected (with 84.3% of all votes. At the political convention of the FDP on 15 May 2015 she got reelected with 88.4% of all votes.

Member of the German Parliament, 2017–2019
Ahead of the 2017 elections, Beer was elected to lead her party’s campaign in the state of Hesse. In the – unsuccessful – negotiations to form a coalition government with the Christian Democrats – both the Christian Democratic Union (CDU) and the Christian Social Union in Bavaria (CSU) – and the Green Party, she was part of her party's delegation. She later became a member of the Committee on Education, Research and Technology Assessment.

Member of the European Parliament, 2019–present
In September 2018, Beer announced that she would lead the FDP list and run for a parliamentary seat in the 2019 European elections.

Following her election, Beer was part of a cross-party working group in charge of drafting the European Parliament's four-year work program on digitization. She has been serving as one of its Vice-Presidents; in this capacity, she has been part of the Parliament’s leadership under Presidents David Sassoli (2019–2022) and Roberta Metsola (since 2022). She also joined the Committee on Industry, Research and Energy. Since 2021, she has been part of the Parliament's delegation to the Conference on the Future of Europe.

Since 2019, Beer has been one of the three deputies of Christian Lindner in his capacity as FDP chairman.

In the negotiations to form a so-called traffic light coalition of the Social Democrats (SPD), the Green Party and the FDP following the 2021 federal elections, Beer led her party's delegation in the working group on European affairs; her co-chairs from the other parties are Udo Bullmann and Franziska Brantner.

Beer repeatedly publicly denied the consensus of climate science. For example, Beer spoke in a tweet in 2017 of the "alleged occurrence of more extreme weather events" using the hashtag "#Fakenews". In a statement, Beer described the "causality of extreme weather situations and climate change" as "scientifically refuted". In contrast to Beer's statement, the greater magnitude and probability of "extreme weather events" has been deemed to be linked to human activity since the IPCC Sixth Assessment Report.

Other activities 
 Deutsche Industrieforschungsgemeinschaft Konrad Zuse, Member of the Senate
 International Martin Luther Foundation, Member of the Board of Trustees (since 2018) 
 Deutsche Stiftung Frauengesundheit, Member of the Board of Trustees
 Association of Private Higher Education Institutions (VPH), Member of the Board of Trustees (since 2015)
 Heraeus Bildungsstiftung, Member of the Advisory Board
 Hessenpark, Member of the Advisory Board
 Max Planck Institute for European Legal History, Member of the Board of Trustees
 Museum of World Cultures, Member of the Board of Trustees
 Stiftung Lesen, Member of the Board of Trustees
 World Vision Deutschland, Member of the Board of Trustees
 German-French Lawyers’ Association (DFJ), Member
 German-Israeli Association (DIG), Member
 Johanniter-Unfall-Hilfe (JUH), Member
 ZDF, Member of the Television Council (2015-2016)

Personal life
Beer is a mother of twins. In 2001, she separated from the children's father, fellow FDP politician Volker Stein. Since 2018, she has been married to lawyer Jürgen Illing.

References

Literature 
 Beer, Nicola, Internationales Biographisches Archiv 36/2012 from 4 September 2012, in Munzinger-Archive (Beginning of the article available for free)

External links 

 Nicola Beers Homepage (German)
 CV at the FDP-parliamentary group in Hesse
 Nicola Beer on Parliamentwatch

Women members of State Parliaments in Germany
1970 births
Politicians from Wiesbaden
Members of the Landtag of Hesse
Living people
MEPs for Germany 2019–2024
Free Democratic Party (Germany) MEPs
Members of the Bundestag for the Free Democratic Party (Germany)
Female members of the Bundestag
Members of the Bundestag 2017–2021
21st-century women MEPs for Germany